Chung Kook-chin (Hangul: 정국진, Hanja: 鄭國振; January 2, 1917 – February 10, 1976) was a Korean football (soccer) player and manager.

He is a descendant of the Korean athletic legends The Three Boar Brothers. He was a member of the South Korea national football team that participated in the 1948 London Olympics and the 1954 Switzerland World Cup. He was famous in his time for wearing eyeglasses during matches. He played forward and, being able to kick with both feet, was usually positioned on the left wing.

He managed South Korea twice as head coach. The first managing period was in 1959 during 1960 Olympics football qualification, and his second tenure included the 1964 Olympics football tournament.

He became Vice President of the Korea Football Association shortly before his death.

References

External links
 

1917 births
1976 deaths
South Korean footballers
South Korea international footballers
Olympic footballers of South Korea
Footballers at the 1948 Summer Olympics
1954 FIFA World Cup players
South Korean football managers
South Korea national football team managers
Asian Games medalists in football
Footballers at the 1954 Asian Games
Asian Games silver medalists for South Korea
Medalists at the 1954 Asian Games
Association football forwards